The 2012 Amstel Curaçao Race took place on 3 November 2012. It was the 11th edition of the Amstel Curaçao Race. The race was held on Curaçao, an island off the Venezuelan coast and spanned . It was the only road bicycle race in which men and women competed against each other in the same race.

Results

External links
 Official Website

References

Amstel Curaçao Race
2012 in road cycling
2012 in Curaçao
2012 in women's road cycling
November 2012 sports events in North America